The Governor Ney Braga de Barros Hydroelectric Plant, formerly known as Segredo, is a dam and hydroelectric power plant on the Iguazu River near Segredo in Paraná, Brazil. It is the fourth dam upstream of the Iguazu Falls and was constructed between 1987 and 1991 while being inaugurated in 1992. The power station has a  capacity and is supplied with water by a concrete face rock-fill embankment dam.

It is owned and operated by Copel who renamed it after Ney Braga de Barros, governor of Paraná between 1961–1965 and 1979–1982. It was the first hydroelectric project in Brazil's history to provide an Environmental Impact Assessment.

History
Construction on the dam began in September 1987 with the diversion of the Iguazu River. Excavations for the dam's foundation began in September 1988 and was completed in December 1989. Construction was complete in 1992.

Ney Braga de Barros Dam
The water from the diverted river increases the reservoir inflows by 10%. The power station contains 4 x  generators.

See also

List of power stations in Brazil

External links

References

Energy infrastructure completed in 1992
Hydroelectric power stations in Paraná (state)
Dams in Paraná (state)
Dams on the Iguazu River
Concrete-face rock-fill dams
Dams completed in 1992